RM Williams Way (route B80) is a road through the Yorke and Mid North region of South Australia connecting Clare in the south through Spalding, Jamestown and Orroroo to Hawker in the Flinders Ranges. The road was named after R. M. Williams who had a strong association with the countryside through which it runs.

Route
RM Williams Way branches from the Horrocks Highway (Main North Road) in Bungaree, about 13 km north of Clare. It runs roughly north to Spalding where it run concurrent with Goyder Highway for about 4 km as it continues north to Jamestown then Orroroo. It ends at the junction with the Flinders Ranges Way about 10 km out of Hawker.

The route runs in the same direction as the northern Mount Lofty Ranges and southern Flinders Ranges, but the climate changes over its length, becoming drier in the north, so the dominant agriculture and vegetation changes from more intensive farming, vineyards and grain crops in the south to pastoral grazing in the north.

Major junctions

References

Roads in South Australia
Mid North (South Australia)